is a Japanese actress, voice actress, singer and gravure idol, known for her role as Yumeria Moegi/Akiba Yellow in the 2012 Super Sentai parody series Unofficial Sentai Akibaranger. She is affiliated with Tambourine Artists and also leader of idol girl group Yumemiru Adolescence.

Discography

"Tesagure! Bukatsu-mono Kanren Gakkyoku-shūte Sagure! Uta Mono":
Stand Up!!!! and 12-Kagetsu with Nishi Asuka, Akesaka Satomi and Ayaka Ōhashi. Tesagure! Bukatsu-mono Theme Song
Call Me "Lazy"
"Tesagure! Bukatsu-mono Anko ̄ru Kanren Gakkyoku-shūte Sagure! Uta mo no Anko ̄ru":
Chan to Stand Up !!!! and Tesaguri bu bu Uta with Nishi Asuka, Akesaka Satomi and Ayaka Ōhashi
Sorezore no 12-kagetsu with Nishi Asuka, Akesaka Satomi, Ayaka Ōhashi and Reina Ueda
"Tesa pull! Uta mono":
Kira Kira Baby×Baby with Mikako Komatsu 
Tesaguri Musical with Nishi Asuka, Akesaka Satomi, Ayaka Ōhashi and Reina Ueda

Filmography

Film
Kamen Rider OOO Wonderful: The Shogun and the 21 Core Medals as Bell (2011)
Cellular Girlfriend + as the main role (2012)
Boku ga Shûgaku Ryokô ni Ikenakatta Riyû (2013)
Finding the Adolescence as Ayumi Sugai (2014)
SUPER Horrifying Story as Misa (2016)
SUPER Horrifying Story 2 as Miwa (2017)
Proof of Love as Ena Ibarada (2019)

TV series
Yume no Mitsuke-kata Oshietaru! 2 as Aoyama Kumiko (2010)
Shimajirō Hesoka as Saya Sanjo (2010, on "Oshiete! 3 Shimai")
Motto Anata no Shiranai Sekai 〜 Kuro Neko no Noroi 〜 as Uchiyama Erika (2011)
Unofficial Sentai Akibaranger as Yumeria Moegi/Akiba Yellow (2012)
Unofficial Sentai Akibaranger: Season 2 as Yuko Yokoyama/Akiba Yellow (2013)
Proof of Love as Ena Ibarada (2018)

Stage
Butai ore wa Hon'nouji ni Ari?! as Mao Shibasaki (2010)
Tiger & Bunny THE LIVE as Kaede Kaburagi (2012)
Gyakuten Saiban: Gyakuten no Spotlight (Turnabout Spotlight) as Mayoi Ayasato (2013, 2014)
K as Anna Kushina (2014)
Vampire Knight as Maria Kurenai (2014)
Gyakuten Saiban 2: Saraba, Gyakuten (Farewell, My Turnabout) as Mayoi Ayasato (2015)
Vampire knight -Revive- as Maria Kurenai (2015)
Ranpo Kitan Game of Laplace ～Panorama Shima no Kaijin～ as Tokiko (2018)

Anime
Ichigo Ichie: Kimi no Kotoba (2010–2011)
be Ponkickies "Rongomax" as Emi (2012)
Copinks! Stories as Quince
Tesagure! Bukatsu-mono series as Aoi Takahashi
Tesagure! Bukatsu-mono (2013)
Tesagure! Bukatsu-mono Encore (2013)
Tesagure! Bukatsumono Spin-off Purupurun Sharumu to Asobou (2014)
Himote House as Nyarin (2018)

Game
Miracle Girls Festival as Aoi Takahashi (2015)
Tesagure! Game-mono as Aoi Takahashi (2017)

Image DVD
Ogikari no Tonari (2011)
Suki Nanda mon 〜Wakeari no Tabi〜 (2011)
Seishun 〜Another Edition〜 (2014)

Bibliography
Karin Ogino First Photo Book "Seishun ~Daini Shou~ " (2014)

References

External links
 
Official agency profile at Tambourine Artists 
 

1995 births
Living people
Actors from Yamanashi Prefecture
Japanese voice actresses
Japanese female models
Japanese idols
Models from Yamanashi Prefecture